Guinevere  is a 1999 American drama film about the artistic and romantic relationship between a young student and her older mentor.

The film was written and directed by Audrey Wells (in her directorial debut) and stars Stephen Rea, Sarah Polley, Jean Smart, and Gina Gershon. The film was a 1999 Sundance Film Festival Jury Prize nominee. It won the Waldo Salt Screenwriting Award for Wells' screenplay, which she shared with Frank Whaley's script for Joe the King. It was also entered into the 21st Moscow International Film Festival.

Plot
Harper Sloane is a misfit in her snobbish, upper-class family of lawyers. She has just been accepted to Harvard Law School. At her sister's wedding, after being sent out from her hiding place in the storage room with a bottle of champagne, she meets Connie Fitzpatrick, a bohemian photographer who takes an instant liking to her and nicknames her "Guinevere". Her visit to his loft in order to pick up the wedding photographs soon blossoms into a full-blown affair, and Harper eventually moves in with Connie as he instructs her in the ways of art, in particular photography.

After a brutal confrontation with Harper's mother, Deborah, and Harper's discovery that Connie has a history of relationships with young women, the film comes to a climax in a downtrodden L.A. hotel where Connie ends the relationship by kicking out Harper. She returns only once, four years later, as he is dying from cirrhosis of the liver, and meets the other Guineveres he has had. On the rooftop, she describes her personal view of his kind of heaven, which she affectionately titles "The Connie Special".

Cast
 Stephen Rea as Connie Fitzpatrick
 Sarah Polley as Harper Sloane
 Jean Smart as Deborah Sloane
 Gina Gershon as Billie
 Paul Dooley as Walter
 Carrie Preston as Patty
 Tracy Letts as Zack
 Emily Procter as Susan Sloane
 Sharon McNight as Leslie (as Sharon Mcnight)
 Gedde Watanabe as Ed
 Carlton Wilborn as Jay
 Sandra Oh as Cindy
 Jasmine Guy as Linda

Production 
With the exception of some exterior shots in the Pacific Heights neighborhood of San Francisco, the film was mostly shot in Los Angeles.

Reception 
Guinevere holds an approval rating of 86% based on 35 reviews on the critics website Rotten Tomatoes.

Lisa Schwarzbaum of Entertainment Weekly wrote, "This patient, perceptive, nonjudgmental love story about age difference is the first to convincingly explain the temporal physics of May-December romances. That writer-director Audrey Wells (who wrote The Truth About Cats & Dogs) promotes the feminine point of view makes this incisive romantic drama all the more valuable. It’s the truth about men and girls." 

Edward Guthmann of the San Francisco Chronicle opined the film is "a quiet character drama that illustrates the fragility of early love and the pain of a trust betrayed. Don't expect sitcom zingers, over mixed rock music or any other Hollywood youth-movie cliches -- this is a movie that disarms with its sincerity and frankness."

Much praise was given to Sarah Polley, with Janet Maslin of The New York Times wrote, "Ms. Polley in particular captures the full emotional range of a young woman trying on the mantle of a Guinevere." Kenneth Turan of the Los Angeles Times said Polley keeps the film and her character from falling into clichés.

Marjorie Baumgarten of The Austin Chronicle noted the film occasionally "bogs down during several fuzzily romantic interludes", but "the twist on this story makes for interesting viewing." She added, "As with her screenplay for The Truth About Cats and Dogs, Wells takes some old clichés about the sexes (in Truth, it was the conflict between beautiful and plain-looking women) and turns them inside out."

Awards and nominations

Notes

References

External links
 
 
 

1999 films
American romantic drama films
Nu Image films
1999 romantic drama films
Films scored by Christophe Beck
Films with screenplays by Audrey Wells
1999 directorial debut films
Films set in San Francisco
Films about photographers
Sundance Film Festival award winners
1999 independent films
1990s English-language films
1990s American films